Moïse Kisling (born Mojżesz Kisling; 22 January 1891 – 29 April 1953) was a Polish-born French painter. He moved to Paris in 1910 at the age of 19, and became a French citizen in 1915, after serving and being wounded with the French Foreign Legion in World War I. He emigrated to the United States in 1940, after the fall of France, and returned there in 1946.

Early life and education
Born in Kraków, Austria-Hungary on 22 January 1891 to Jewish Parents. He studied at the Academy of Fine Arts in Krakow with Jozef Pankiewicz. His teachers encouraged the young man to go to Paris, France, considered the international center for artistic creativity in the early 20th century. In 1910, Kisling moved to Montmartre in Paris initially living on Rue des Beaux-Arts, and a few years later to Montparnasse.

At the outbreak of World War I, he volunteered for service in the French Foreign Legion. After being seriously wounded in 1916 in the Battle of the Somme, he was awarded French citizenship.

He married Renée Kisling (née Gros) in 1916, and together they had two sons, Jean (1922) and Guy Kisling (1922).

Career

Kisling lived and worked in Montparnasse as part of its renowned artistic community, he joined an émigré community made up of artists from eastern Europe as well as Americans and British. Most of the French kept to themselves, although the artistic community was international. In 1911–1912 he spent nearly a year at Céret. And by 1913, he had moved to Bateau-Lavoir in Montmartre, where he lived briefly.

Eventually around 1913, he took a home residence and art studio on 3 Rue Joseph-Bara in Montparnasse, however he spent a lot of his time in Southern France in the 1920s. Kisling maintained the Paris residence and studio on Rue Joseph-Bara through World War II, and upon his return after the war it had been ransacked. The artists Jules Pascin, Léopold Zborowski, and later Amedeo Modigliani lived in the same building.

He became close friends with many of his contemporaries, including Amedeo Modigliani, who painted a portrait of him in 1916 (in the collection of the Musée d'Art Moderne de la Ville de Paris). His style in painting landscapes is similar to that of Marc Chagall. A master at depicting the female body, his surreal nudes and portraits earned him the widest acclaim.

Kisling volunteered for army service again in 1940 during World War II, although he was 49. When the French Army was discharged at the time of the surrender to the Germans, Kisling emigrated to the United States. He rightly feared for his safety as a Jew in occupied France. He exhibited in New York City and Washington. He settled in Southern California, and had his first art exhibition there in 1942. The Kinsling family lived next door to Aldous Huxley and his family in Southern California, where they stayed there until 1946.

Under the Vichy government, certain critics suggested too many foreigners, especially Jews, were diminishing French traditions. Their comments were part of a rise in anti-Semitism during the German occupation, resulting in French cooperation in the deportation and deaths of tens of thousands of foreign and French Jews in concentration camps. Kisling returned to France after the war and defeat of Germany.

Death and legacy 
Moïse Kisling died at his house in Bandol, Var, Provence-Alpes-Côte d'Azur, France on 29 April 1953. He had been ill with stomach issues for ten days, prior to his death.

A residential street in the town of Sanary-sur-Mer is named after him.

His work is in various public museum collections, including at the Harvard Art Museums, British Museum, the Metropolitan Museum of Art, Tokyo Fuji Art Museum, the Israel Museum, Ikeda 20 Seiki Museum, amongst others. A large collection of Kisling's works is held by the Musée du Petit Palais in Geneva, Switzerland.

Gallery

References

External links
 
 Agence photo de la Réunion des musées nationaux RMN
 

1891 births
1953 deaths
Jews from Galicia (Eastern Europe)
20th-century French painters
French male painters
20th-century Polish painters
20th-century French male artists
Jewish painters
Jewish artists
Modern painters
French military personnel of World War I
French Army personnel of World War II
Polish painters of Jewish descent
19th-century Polish Jews
Soldiers of the French Foreign Legion
Artists from Kraków
Polish emigrants to France
Polish male painters
Jewish School of Paris